Chen Zheng may refer to:

Chen Zheng (Tang dynasty) (616–677), Tang Dynasty general responsible for developing the city of Zhangzhou
Xiao Yang (1929–1998), politician of the People's Republic of China
George Chen, born Chen Zheng, materials science professor at University of Nottingham

See also
 Zheng Chen (born 1965), Chinese sprinter, silver medalist in sprint at the Athletics at the 1990 Asian Games